Lucius-Duquesnes Gustave (born September 24, 1893 in Sainte-Anne, Guadeloupe, and died July 15, 1972 in Paris) was a politician from Guadeloupe who represented and served Togo in the French Senate from 1946-1952 .

References 
 page on the French Senate website

Guadeloupean politicians
French people of Guadeloupean descent
French Senators of the Fourth Republic
1893 births
1972 deaths
Senators of French West Africa